Asphalt 3: Street Rules is a racing video game by Gameloft Shanghai that was released in 2006 on Java-based mobile phones, in 2007 on non-Java based mobile phones and was also released in 2008 for Nokia's N-Gage 2.0 gaming platform. The third major game of Asphalt series. It is the first mobile game to be played at the World Cyber Games competition. It was also the first in the series not to be released for the Nintendo DS.

The gameplay includes an "Instant Race" mode, where the player is placed in a random city's race with any one of the player's owned cars, and a "Career" mode, which is the heart of the game. The player starts with a Mini Cooper S and has the option of unlocking 11 other sports cars and bikes, each with their own tuning. The initial game ends when the player has finished all of the races with a podium finish. The final end comes when the player has achieved a 'Gold' in all of the events, and is thus declared the best in the 'underground racing league'. Even after completing the career mode, the player can still take part in any of the events to earn more money.

Gameplay
The gameplay consists of a variety of Events:
Race: Where the player starts from the bottom of the grid and competes against seven other racers, with the main objective of finishing first at the end of three laps, while avoiding police cruisers and road blocks.
Duel: A "One-on-One" race where the player must catch up with and overtake sole opponent to finish first at the end of two laps to win.
Beat'em all: In this mode, the player's objective is to crash a certain number of rival racing cars or police cars before the end of the third lap.
Cop Chase: This mode features the racer taking the role of a cop, and with the objective of crashing the boss racer, without harming the other racers and the civilian cars. The player starts with $30,000 cash and loses money every time they cause "collateral damage".
Cash Attack:  This mode is similar to the normal race, except with the added objective of earning as much money as possible, through illegal acts like Drifts, Overspeeding and Takedowns.

To be disqualified from a race means that the player fails to finish the race even though all the other racers have finished the race. When the player is disqualified, their vehicle is wrecked and they earn the least amount or no amount of credits possible.

In Asphalt 3: Street Rules, the cop chase race type strictly forbids wrecking of any type and will immediately disqualify the player if they wreck.

References

2006 video games
3
Gameloft games
Mobile games
Symbian software games
N-Gage service games
Java platform games
Video games about police officers
Video games set in Hawaii
Video games set in India
Video games set in the Las Vegas Valley
Video games set in Rome
Video games set in Saint Petersburg
Video games set in San Francisco
Video games set in Tokyo
Video games developed in China